Kindi is a type of a pitcher usually found in old houses in Kerala and other parts of India.

Early examples of Kindi first appears in Chalcolithic period cultures of South Asia, notably in Savalda Culture and two well-preserved examples from Jorwe culture pottery dating to 2nd millennium BC.

Usually made of bell metal, it is commonly used during Puja to dispense holy water. Kindi is also used to keep water at the entrance of the house, so that visitors can wash their feet with this water, and also to wash hands after meals.

The shape of Kindi is very effective to minimize water loss while washing the feet or hand, as it has only a small aperture to pour water. Its shape is also very attractive. While using Kindi, the hands of the user never touch the water inside the Kindi, so that water never get contaminated.

See also
 Lota (vessel)
 Kalasha

References

Objects used in Hindu worship